The Saint-Martinois records in swimming are the fastest ever performances of swimmers from the Saint Martin, which are recognised and ratified by the Saint Martin Aquatic Federation.

All records were set in finals unless noted otherwise.

Long Course (50 m)

Men

Women

Short Course (25 m)

Men

Women

References

Saint Martin